{{Automatic taxobox
|image = Starr 080604-5952 Eustachys petraea.jpg
|image_caption = Eustachys petraeaMidway Atoll, Pacific Ocean
|display_parents = 3
|taxon = Eustachys
|authority = Desv. 1810 <ref name=ipni1> The Genus Eustachys was first named and described in "Nouveau Bulletin des Sciences par la Société Philomatique de Paris 2: 188. 1810". {{ cite web |url=http://www.ipni.org:80/ipni/idPlantNameSearch.do?id=30011220-2 |title=Plant Name Details for Poaceae Eustachys Desv. |quote=Type Information: Type Name: E. petraea (Sw.) Desv. ('petraeus') (Chloris petraea Sw. |work=IPNI |accessdate=May 2, 2011}}</ref> not Salisb. 1866 (syn of Ornithogalum)
|type_species = Eustachys petraea 
|type_species_authority = (Sw.) Desv.
|synonyms_ref = 
|synonyms =
 Chloroides Fisch. ex Regel
 Schultesia Spreng.
}}Eustachys (fan grass or fingergrass''')  is a genus of tropical and subtropical plants in the grass family. It is native primarily to warmer parts of  the Americas, with a few species in Africa and Asia.Grassbase - The World Online Grass Flora

Species
Species include:The Plant List search for EustachysBiota of North America Program 2013 county distribution maps
 Eustachys bahiensis (Steud.) Herter - Brazil (Bahia, Paraná, Pernambuco), Bolivia (Chuquisaca, Santa Cruz), Uruguay, Argentina
 Eustachys brevipila (Roseng. & Izag.) Caro & E.A.Sánchez - Uruguay, Argentina (Corrientes, Entre Rios), Brazil (Mato Grosso do Sul, Rio Grande do Sul)
 Eustachys calvescens (Hack.) Caro & E.A.Sánchez  - Uruguay, Argentina (Misiones), Paraguay, Brazil (Mato Grosso, Paraná, Santa Catarina)
 Eustachys caribaea (Spreng.) Herter - Uruguay, Argentina, Paraguay, Brazil, Bolivia; naturalized in United States (TX LA MS GA)
 Eustachys distichophylla Nees - Uruguay, Argentina, Chile, Paraguay, Brazil, Bolivia, Peru; naturalized in United States (CA AL GA FL)
 Eustachys floridana Chapm. - United States (AL GA FL)
 Eustachys glauca Chapm. - United States (MS AL GA FL SC NC)
 Eustachys neglecta (Nash) Nash - United States (AL TX FL)
 Eustachys paranensis A.M.Molina - Brazil (Paraná)
 Eustachys paspaloides (Vahl) Lanza & Mattei - Oman, Yemen, eastern + southern Africa from Eritrea to Cape Province
 Eustachys petraea (Sw.) Desv. - United States (TX LA MS AL GA FL SC NC  PA NY), Mexico, West Indies (Bahamas, Greater + Lesser Antilles), Central + South America; naturalized on various Pacific Islands (Hawaii, Midway, Carolines, Marianas, Kiribati)
 Eustachys retusa (Lag.) Kunth - Uruguay, Argentina, Paraguay, Brazil, Bolivia; naturalized in United States (TX FL GA SC NY)
 Eustachys swalleniana A.M.Molina -  Brazil (Paraná, Rio Grande do Sul), Uruguay (Cerro Largo)
 Eustachys tenera (J.S.Presl) A.Camus - New Guinea, southeast Asia, southern China incl Taiwan
 Eustachys uliginosa (Hack.) Herter - Uruguay, Argentina (Corrientes, Entre Rios, Misiones), Paraguay, Brazil (Paraná, Santa Catarina, Rio Grande do Sul), Bolivia (Santa Cruz)

Former species
Some species formerly under Eustachys are under the genera Chloris or Ornithogalum, they include:
 Eustachys gayana - Chloris gayana Eustachys polystachya - Chloris submutica  
 Eustachys submutica - Chloris submutica  
 Eustachys latifolia - Ornithogalum arabicum 
 Eustachys pyramidale - Ornithogalum pyramidale''

References

Chloridoideae
Grasses of North America
Grasses of South America
Grasses of Argentina
Grasses of Brazil
Grasses of Mexico
Grasses of the United States
Poaceae genera